Sherman Creek may refer to:

Sherman Creek (New York)
Sherman Creek (Pennsylvania)